Nationality words link to articles with information on the nation's poetry or literature (for instance, Irish or France).

Events
 François de Malherbe is attached this year to the court of Henry IV of France

Works

Great Britain
 Nicholas Breton:
 The Honour of Valour
 The Soules Immortall Crowne
 Samuel Daniel, Certaine Small Poems Lately Printed
 John Davies of Hereford:
 Humours Heav'n on Earth
 Wittes Pilgrimage (by Poeticall Essaies)
 Robert Jones, Ultimum Vale
 Samuel Rowlands:
 Hell's Broke Loose, on John of Leiden, a Dutch Anabaptist
 Humors Antique Faces, published anonymously
 Joshua Sylvester, translator, Bartas: his Devine Weekes and Works Translated, translated from Guillaume de Salluste du Bartas; includes previously published translations
 Peter Woodhouse, The Flea

Other
 Pedro de Espinosa, editor, Flores de poetas ilustres (anthology), Spain
 François de Malherbe, Prière pour le roi Henri le Grand, allant en Limousin, because of this poem, he became the poet laureate of the French Court
 Jean Vauquelin de La Fresnaye:
 Discours pour servir de Préface sur le Sujet de la Satyre published from 1604 through this year
 L’Art poétique de Vauquelin de la Fresnaye : où l’on peut remarquer la Perfection et le Défaut des Anciennes et des Modernes Poésies ("The Poetic Art of Vauquelin de la Fresnaye: where one can observe the Perfection and Failure of Ancient and Modern Poems") written beginning in 1574 at the request of Henry III of France, first published this year, criticism, France

Births
 March 28 – Nishiyama Sōin 西山宗因, born Nishiyama Toyoichi 西山豊 (died 1682), Japanese early Tokugawa period haikai-no-renga (comical renga) poet, founder of the Danrin ("talkative forest") school of haikai poetry
 June – Thomas Randolph (died 1635), English poet and dramatist
 July 29 – Simon Dach (died 1659), Prussian German lyrical poet and hymn writer
 November 4 – William Habington (died 1654), English poet
 Also:
 Peter Hausted (died 1644), English playwright, poet and preacher
 Sor Marcela de San Félix (died 1688),  Spanish nun, poet and dramatist, illegitimate daughter of Lope de Vega
 William Mercer (died 1675), Scottish poet and army officer
 Lady Hester Pulter, born Hester Ley (died 1678), Irish-born English poet

Deaths
 September 23 – Pontus de Tyard (born c. 1521), French poet and priest, a member of "La Pléiade"
 Also:
 Diogo Bernardes died about this year (born c. 1530), Portuguese poet, brother of Frei Agostinho da Cruz
 Thomas Hudson (born unknown), English musician and poet

Notes

17th-century poetry
Poetry